The 1970 Copa Libertadores de América was the 11th edition of CONMEBOL's top Association football club tournament. Estudiantes successfully defended their title for the second straight year by defeating Peñarol in the finals. Teams from Brazil did not participate in this year's tournament due to CBF still disagreeing with the format.

Qualified teams

First phase
Defending champions Estudiantes (LP) received a bye until the third phase.

Group 1

Group 2

Group 3

Group 4

Second phase
From this phase onwards, the team that advances from groups that have two teams (including the winner of the finals) will be decided by points (two for a win, one for a draw). If after two games, no one team has the most points, a single-game playoff will be played on neutral grounds to determine who advances (or wins as is the case for the finals). If the playoff game ends in a draw, goal difference will be used a tie-breaker.

Zone 1

Zone 2

Zone 3

Third phase

Semi-final A

Semi-final B

Finals

Champion

References

External links
Match results at CONMEBOL's website (In Spanish)
In English
Match result at RSSSF's website

1
Copa Libertadores seasons